Free and Easy is a 1941 film directed by George Sidney, and starring Robert Cummings and Ruth Hussey. The film is a remake of MGM's But the Flesh Is Weak (1932) with Robert Montgomery and C. Aubrey Smith as the son-and-father team.

Both films are based on the 1928 play The Truth Game by Ivor Novello.

Cast
Robert Cummings as Max Clemington
Ruth Hussey as Martha Gray
Judith Anderson as Lady Joan Culver 
C. Aubrey Smith as Duke Colver
Nigel Bruce as Florian Clemington
Charles Coleman as Powers, Culver's butler
Reginald Owen as Sir Kelvin
Teresa Maxwell-Conover as Lady Ridgeway

Plot
Max (Cummings) and his father (Bruce) are both looking to marry wealthy women, which would be easier if either one of them had any money of their own.

Max decides on Martha (Hussey), but Martha says no when he says that he is poor as she admits she is also. So she accepts the proposal of Sir Kelvin (Owen), but changes her mind by the next day. When Florian tries to win money gambling for Max's wedding, he loses a bundle. When Max finds out about the debt, he decides to marry the wealthy Lady Joan (Anderson) to keep Florian out of jail.

Production
It was George Sidney's first feature as director. "Nobody else on the lot would do it," he later said. He had worked at MGM since 1931 and been directing studio shorts and screen tests; two of his shorts won Oscars - Quicker 'n a Wink (1940) and Of Pups and Puzzles (1941). This enabled him to move up to features.

Sidney had directed Robert Cummings in a screen test in 1935.

Cummings was borrowed from Universal in December 1940. Filming started in late December 1940. The week before filming Edward Buzzell was to direct. However then Sidney stepped in. Filming ended in January 1941 though there were some reshoots later in the month.

Reception

Critical
The Los Angeles Times said Cummings plays "a likable cad who isn't too likable outside of his own natural effervescence." The New York Times said it was made with "a lack of success... only Robert Cummings, as the bouncing hero, gives the impression of enjoying himself. And Mr Cummings's enthusiasm is of the bouncing, juvenile sort. So the whole thing adds up to a vapid and completely inconsequential charade."

In 1945 George Sidney told a reporter doing a profile on him that "I'm sure you missed [the film] and you were lucky if you did." One of Sidney's obituaries called it "a feeble comedy." However it did launch his career.

Box office
According to MGM records the film earned $205,000 in the US and Canada and $128,000 elsewhere resulting in a loss of $33,000.

References

External links

1941 films
1941 romantic comedy films
American black-and-white films
1941 directorial debut films
Films directed by George Sidney
American films based on plays
Films set in London
American romantic comedy films
Metro-Goldwyn-Mayer films
1940s English-language films
1940s American films